Sveio Church is a parish church of the Church of Norway in Sveio Municipality in Vestland county, Norway. It is located in the village of Sveio. It is the church for the Sveio parish which is part of the Sunnhordland prosti (deanery) in the Diocese of Bjørgvin. The white, wooden church was built in a long church design in 1858 using plans drawn up by the architect Andreas Grønning. The church seats about 630 people.

History
The earliest existing historical records of the church date back to the year 1686, but at that time it was described as an old, dilapidated stave church without a tower. The first church in Sveio was a wooden stave church that was possibly built during the 14th century. It had an open air corridor built all the way around the building. The church was surrounded by a  cemetery. 

In 1688, that church was torn down and a new timber-framed church was built by the builder Oluff Bysemb from Osterøy. The new church was located slightly to the west of the previous church, but still located inside the cemetery. The new church was partially constructed with salvaged materials from the previous building.

After about 170 years, the church was too small for the congregation, so it was decided to tear down the old church and build a new one. The new, wooden church was consecrated on 22 August 1858.

See also
List of churches in Bjørgvin

References

Sveio
Churches in Vestland
Long churches in Norway
Wooden churches in Norway
19th-century Church of Norway church buildings
Churches completed in 1858
14th-century establishments in Norway